Kiong may be,

Kiong language

People
Tan Wee Kiong
Kiong Kong Tuan
Liem Yoe Kiong
Ling Sie Kiong